In enzymology, a glucosamine-1-phosphate N-acetyltransferase is an enzyme that catalyzes the chemical reaction

acetyl-CoA + alpha-D-glucosamine 1-phosphate  CoA + N-acetyl-alpha-D-glucosamine 1-phosphate

Thus, the two substrates of this enzyme are acetyl-CoA and alpha-D-glucosamine 1-phosphate, whereas its two products are CoA and N-acetyl-alpha-D-glucosamine 1-phosphate.

This enzyme belongs to the family of transferases, specifically those acyltransferases transferring groups other than aminoacyl groups.  The systematic name of this enzyme class is acetyl-CoA:alpha-D-glucosamine-1-phosphate N-acetyltransferase. This enzyme participates in aminosugars metabolism.

Structural studies

References

 

EC 2.3.1
Enzymes of known structure